Geoffrey William Grasett  (28 July 1890 – 31 October 1934) was an English first-class cricketer and British Army officer.

Grasett was born at Hereford in July 1890. He later studied at Brasenose College, Oxford where he made a single appearance in first-class cricket for Oxford University against H. K. Foster's XI at Oxford in 1912. He took 2 wickets in the match by dismissing Christopher Collier and Cecil Ponsonby in the H. K. Foster's XI first-innings. Grasett was commissioned as a second lieutenant in the Oxford University Contingent of the Officers' Training Corps in March 1912. 

He served in the First World War with the Royal Army Service Corps. He was made a temporary lieutenant in May 1915, before being made a temporary captain in November of the same year. He gained the full rank of captain in September 1917. Grasett was made an OBE in the 1919 New Year Honours for services rendered during the war in France and Flanders. By August 1920, he was a temporary major but had relinquished the rank. He was seconded for service with the Territorial Army in November 1930. His health began to deteriorate in 1933, with Grasett being placed on the half–pay list on account of ill health in February. By November of the same year, his health had deteriorated enough for him to be retired on account of his ill health. He died at Cranham, Gloucestershire in October 1934.

References

External links

1890 births
1934 deaths
Military personnel from Herefordshire
People from Hereford
Alumni of Brasenose College, Oxford
Officers' Training Corps officers
English cricketers
Oxford University cricketers
British Army personnel of World War I
Royal Army Service Corps officers
Officers of the Order of the British Empire